Rage & The Machine is the eighth and final studio album by American rapper  turned podcaster Joe Budden. It was released on October 21, 2016, by Mood Muzik Entertainment and Empire Distribution. The album was entirely produced by AraabMuzik.

Commercial performance
The album debuted at number 40 on the Billboard 200, selling 11,341 copies in the United States.

Track listing
All tracks produced by AraabMuzik.

Charts

References

2016 albums
Joe Budden albums
Empire Distribution albums
Albums produced by AraabMuzik